You Can't Keep a Good Band Down is an album by Randy, released in 1998 on Ampersand Records.

Critical reception

You Can't Keep a Good Band Down received critical acclaim upon its release. AllMusic reviewer Kurt Morris, who awarded the album 4.5 out of 5 stars, credited the band for "creatively displaying a mix of infectious grooves, '50s influence, anti-establishment energy, and much more," stating that the band's harmonies and melodies are "remarkable for a punk act." Lyrically, Morris compliments the band for "[expressing] their anarchist views […] in a way that is honest and open," as well as for including "silly stories" in songs such as "The Exorcist," "Me and the Boys," and "Randy, I Don't Need You." Morris concludes his review by stating, "Randy seems to have made a very successful album that will most likely be overlooked by many, but it's their loss, as all the pieces truly are in place." Morris distinguishes "Holy Shit," "The Exorcist," and "They Fear Us" as standout tracks.

In a retrospective review for PunkNews published four years after the album's release, Dubar also awards the album with 4.5 out of 5 stars. He points out the band's drastic "reinvention" compared to their previous style, which was more in line with skate punk outfits like Satanic Surfers. On the contrary, Dubar points out that You Can't Keep a Good Band Down is "noticeably less aggressive, much more catchy, and that's not a bad thing at all." He positively likens the band's reinvention to Bad Religion, "but with less big words, and they seem to be having a LOT more fun." He compliments Randy's "straightforward" lyrical style and avoidance of metaphors and poetry in favor of "tackling realistic ideas and offering real-world solutions." Dubar distinguishes "The Exorcist," "Superstar," "Randy, I Don't Need You," "They Fear Us," and "Working Class Radio" as stand-out tracks.

Track listing

Information
 Recorded at Das Boot Rec & Play by Pelle Gunnerfeldt (of Fireside)
 Produced by Randy, Jejo Perkovic, Pelle Gunnerfeldt
 Mixed by Pelle Gunnerfeldt
 Mastered by Pelle Henricsson
 Released by Ampersand Records in 1998
 Re-released by Burning Heart Records in 2002 with inclusion of both deluxe edition tracks
 Cover designed by Jonas Berglund and Stefan Granberg

Credits
 Fredrik Granberg - drums
 Johan Gustafsson - bass, background vocals
 Stefan Granberg - vocals, guitar
 Johan Brändström - guitar, background vocals, some lead vocals
 Per Nordmark (of Fireside) - maracas on "Randy, I Don't Need You"
 Jejo Perkovic - tambourine and drums on "Randy, I Don't Need You", producer
 Randy - composer, engineer, primary artist, producer

References

1998 in Swedish music
1998 albums
Pop punk albums by Swedish artists
Randy (band) albums
G7 Welcoming Committee Records albums